Playmobil Interactive is a brand name used by Geobra Brandstätter GmbH for releasing Video Games, Software, DVDs and Apps featuring Playmobil themes.

Titles
Alex Builds his Farm (1999; Windows)
Laura's Happy Adventures (1999; Windows, Game Boy Color)
Hype: The Time Quest (1999; Windows, Game Boy Color, PlayStation 2)
Rescue from Rock Castle (2004; Windows)
The Big Treasure Hunt (2005; Windows)
Playmobil Alarm (2007; Windows)
Playmobil Constructions (2007; Windows)
Playmobil Knights (2009; Windows, Nintendo DS)
Playmobil Pirates (2009; Windows, Nintendo DS)
Playmobil: The Secret of Pirate Island (2009; DVD)
Playmobil Circus (2009; Wii)
Playmobil Top Agents (2010; Nintendo DS)
Playmobil Pirates (2012; IOS)
Playmobil Princess (2014; IOS)
Playmobil Luxusvilla (2014; IOS)
Playmobil Knights (2014; IOS)

Lists of video games by franchise